KELP (1590 kHz) is an American AM radio station licensed to serve the community of El Paso, Texas, United States. The station broadcasts a Christian radio format to the greater El Paso metropolitan area.  The station is currently owned by McClatchey Broadcasting.  KELP airs a mix of local and syndicated programming, including several shows from the Moody Bible Institute. The station was known as KINT until May 7, 1979, when it became KKOL. In the early 1980s it switched to the KELP call sign.

According to FCC records, the station was ordered off the air on July 12, 2006, due to an untimely filing of its license renewal. KELP noted that it had filed an application before the deadline, but admitted to not paying the renewal fee. It filed a new application with the application fee on that date. It had also sought special temporary authorizations to remain on-air, which it received. On February 15, 2008, the FCC granted KELP's license renewal.

References

External links

ELP
Radio stations established in 1979
1979 establishments in Texas